Pampan is a village located in the Ancash Region of Peru. It is nestled in a valley approximately one hour's walk from the village of Chiquian and a three- to four-hour bus ride from Huaraz, the capital of Ancash Region. Views of the Huayhuash mountain range in the distance and steep, green hillsides in the foreground make the journey to Pampan a breathtaking one.

A small village with a population of approximately 400, Pampan did not exist until the early-1970s when, in the wake of the 1970 Ancash earthquake, many of the region's inhabitants were left homeless. Pampan was built from scratch out of mud bricks to serve as a new village of many victims of the earthquake.

There is a school in the village and a project is underway to construct and stock a new library.

Populated places in the Ancash Region